Nyamira is a town in Kenya. It is the capital of its Nyamira County. It has an urban population of around 10.000 (1999 census).
The main government hospital is Nyamira District Hospital with a bed capacity of 203.

Notable people 
Emily Orwaru, aeronautical engineer
Clinton Nyanaro, environmental and biosystems engineer

References

Nyamira County
Populated places in Nyanza Province
County capitals in Kenya